The 2018 European Short Track Speed Skating Championships took place, for the third time, from 12–14 January 2018 in Dresden, Germany.

Medal summary

Medal table

Men's events
The results of the Championships:

Women's events
The results of the Championships:

Participating nations

See also
Short track speed skating
European Short Track Speed Skating Championships

References

External links
 Official website
Results book
 

European Short Track Speed Skating Championships
European Short Track Speed Skating Championships
European Short Track Speed Skating Championships
International speed skating competitions hosted by Germany
Sport in Dresden
European Short Track Speed Skating Championships